The whitecheek lanternshark (Etmopterus alphus) is a shark of the family Etmopteridae found in the western Indian Ocean.

References

Etmopterus
Fish described in 2016